Forty Years On is a 1968 play by Alan Bennett. It was his first West End play.

Subject
The play is set in a British public school called Albion House ("Albion" is an ancient word for Britain), which is putting on an end of term play in front of the parents, i.e. the audience. The play within the play is about the changes that had happened to the country following the end of the Great War in 1918 and the loss of innocence and a generation of young men. In a 1999 study of Bennett's work, Peter Wolfe writes that the author calls the piece "part play, part revue"; Wolfe describes it as "nostalgic and astringent, elegiac and unsettling".

The play includes a satire on T. E. Lawrence; known as "Tee Hee Lawrence" because of his high-pitched, girlish giggle. "Clad in the magnificent white silk robes of an Arab prince ... he hoped to pass unnoticed through London. Alas he was mistaken." The section concludes with the headmaster confusing him with D. H. Lawrence.

Russell Harty, whom Bennett had become friends with at Exeter College, Oxford, was teaching English at Giggleswick School when the play was written. Harty was housemaster of Carr House and several of the schoolboys in the play had the surnames of boys in Carr House.

Productions
The first production of Forty Years On opened at the Apollo Theatre in Shaftesbury Avenue on 31 October 1968, directed by Patrick Garland and was an immediate success. The school's headmaster was played by John Gielgud; Paul Eddington was Franklin and Alan Bennett played Tempest.  It ran until 24 November 1969.  The full cast was:

Bottomley  – Stephen Leigh
Cartwright  – Andrew Branch
Charteris  – Freddie Foot
Crabtree  – Colin Reese
Dishforth  – Peter Kinley
Foster  – William Burleigh
Franklin  – Paul Eddington (portrayed by David Horovitch in the 1984 revival and Robert Bathurst in the audio drama)
Gillings  – Dickie Harris
Headmaster  – John Gielgud (portrayed by Emlyn Williams in the last 3 months of the original run, Paul Eddington in the 1984 revival and Alan Bennett in the audio drama)
Jarvis  – Stephen Price
Leadbetter  – Paul Guess
Lord  – Robert Langley
Macilwaine  – Keith McNally
Matron  – Dorothy Reynolds (portrayed by Phyllida Law in the 1984 revival and Eleanor Bron in the audio drama)
Miss Nisbitt  – Nora Nicholson
Moss  – Mark Hughes
Organist  – Carl Davis
Rumbold  – Merlin Ward
Salter  – Denis McGrath
Skinner  – Anthony Andrews
Spooner  – Roger Brain
Tempest  – Alan Bennett (portrayed by Stephen Fry in the 1984 revival)
The Lectern Reader  – Robert Swann
Tredgold  – George Fenton
Tupper  – Allan Warren
Wigglesworth  – Thomas Cockrell
Wimpenny  – Philip Chappell

A revival of the play was staged by Chichester Festival Theatre, with Richard Wilson playing the Headmaster, in April 2017.

Notes

References
 

1968 plays
Plays by Alan Bennett
Cultural depictions of T. E. Lawrence